John Joseph Capek is a composer, arranger, keyboardist, producer.

Biography

John Capek was born in Prague, Czechoslovakia (now Czech Republic). on 27 November 1947. He is the son of Fred Capek, a concert pianist and Mechanical Engineer, and Irene Capek, both survivors of Terezin and the Auschwitz concentration camp. Capek moved with his family to Melbourne, Australia at the age of three. His father was his first piano teacher and showed him the works of Czech composers Bedřich Smetana and Antonín Dvorak, which he was playing by the age of three. 
Capek’s wife Batsheva, born in Toronto, Canada, is a singer and guitar player, known for her Yiddish and Hebrew songs.

Career

Capek studied piano as a child, then later, influenced by Little Richard, Ray Charles and Chuck Berry, co-founded Carson, one of Australia's premier blues bands. He graduated as a Chemical Engineer but left this job soon after to pursue his passion of music. Capek then played in the bands King Harvest, Flite, and with Australian music artists Doug Parkinson and Renee Geyer. 

In 1973 Capek emigrated to Canada.

In Toronto Capek played keyboards and arranged songs for Marc Jordan, Ian Thomas, Dan Hill and Dianne Brooks, and produced hit recordings for Hill, Ken Tobias, The Good Brothers, the Downchild Blues Band and Amy Sky. He formed a songwriting partnership with Jordan and moved to Los Angeles, placing songs with René Shuman, Rod Stewart, Joe Cocker, Diana Ross, Manhattan Transfer, Isaac Hayes and many others. As a session musician Capek recorded with legendary producers Humberto Gatica and John Boylan. As "John Capek & The Family of Man" he released his debut recording, "Indaba (Mesa Blue Moon)".

Capek co-wrote much of Australian singer John Paul Young's 1984 album, One Foot in Front. 

Returning to Toronto in 1995, John continued writing for Stewart, as well as for Cher, Amanda Marshall, Bonnie Raitt amongst others, and also scored the television series "Grandpa's Garden" and "Letters to God".

Appointments

John Capek is a former director of the Songwriters Association of Canada and the Canadian Songwriters Hall of Fame, and founding faculty member of the songwriting program at the Royal Conservatory of Music.

Songwriting

An exceptionally prolific pop songwriter, Capek is noted for his use of complex harmonies, mostly associated with Tin Pan Alley. His biggest success to date has been Rhythm of My Heart with Rod Stewart. Other Capek hits include "Take Me Home" with Joe Cocker and featured in the film Blown Away, "Promises" with Amanda Marshall, "Love So High" with Cher, and "Deep Water" with Bonnie Raitt. His songs have also been recorded by artists in the Czech Republic and used in films such as Cocktail, The Silencer and The Perfect Storm.

References

Encyclopedia of Music in Canada
Songwriters Association of Canada
Production Music Online
HitQuarters

External links
www.JohnCapek.com
Interview, HitQuarters Jan 2007

Australian songwriters
Academic staff of The Royal Conservatory of Music
Living people
Musicians from Prague
Year of birth missing (living people)
Czechoslovak emigrants to Canada
Canadian male composers
Canadian songwriters
20th-century Canadian composers
20th-century Canadian male musicians
21st-century Canadian composers
21st-century Canadian male musicians